Slate is an online magazine that covers current affairs, politics, and culture in the United States. It was created in 1996 by former New Republic editor Michael Kinsley, initially under the ownership of Microsoft as part of MSN. In 2004, it was purchased by The Washington Post Company (later renamed the Graham Holdings Company), and since 2008 has been managed by The Slate Group, an online publishing entity created by Graham Holdings. Slate is based in New York City, with an additional office in Washington, D.C.

Slate, which is updated throughout the day, covers politics, arts and culture, sports, and news. According to its former editor-in-chief Julia Turner, the magazine is "not fundamentally a breaking news source", but rather aimed at helping readers to "analyze and understand and interpret the world" with witty and entertaining writing. As of mid-2015, it publishes about 1,500 stories per month.

A French version, slate.fr, was launched in February 2009 by a group of four journalists, including Jean-Marie Colombani, Eric Leser, and economist Jacques Attali. Among them, the founders hold 50 percent in the publishing company, while The Slate Group holds 15 percent. In 2011, slate.fr started a separate site covering African news, Slate Afrique, with a Paris-based editorial staff.

 the magazine is both ad-supported and has a membership model with a metered paywall. It is known, and sometimes criticized, for having adopted contrarian views, giving rise to the term "Slate Pitches". It has a generally liberal editorial stance.

Background
Slate features regular and semi-regular columns such as Explainer, Moneybox, Spectator, Transport, and Dear Prudence. Many of the articles are short (less than 2,000 words) and argument-driven. Around 2010, the magazine also began running long-form journalism. Many of the longer stories are an outgrowth of the "Fresca Fellowships", so-called because former editor Plotz liked the soft drink Fresca. "The idea is that every writer and editor on staff has to spend a month or six weeks a year not doing their regular job, but instead working on a long, ambitious project of some sort," Plotz said in an interview.

Slate introduced a paywall-based business model in 1998 that attracted up 20,000 subscribers but was later abandoned. A similar subscription model was implemented in April 2001 by Slates independently owned competitor, Salon.com.

Slate started a daily feature, "Today's Pictures", on November 30, 2005, which featured 15–20 photographs from the archive at Magnum Photos that share a common theme. The column also features two Flash animated "Interactive Essays" a month.

On its 10th anniversary, Slate unveiled a redesigned website. It introduced Slate V in 2007, an online video magazine with content that relates to or expands upon their written articles. In 2013, the magazine was redesigned under the guidance of design director Vivian Selbo.

Slate was nominated for four digital National Magazine Awards in 2011 and won the NMA for General Excellence. In the same year, the magazine laid off several high-profile journalists, including co-founder Jack Shafer and Timothy Noah (author of the Chatterbox column). At the time, it had around 40 full-time editorial staff. The following year, a dedicated ad sales team was created.

Slate launched the "Slate Book Review" in 2012, a monthly books section edited by Dan Kois.

The next year, Slate became profitable after preceding years had seen layoffs and falling ad revenues.

In 2014, Slate introduced a paywall system called "Slate Plus", offering ad-free podcasts and bonus materials. A year later, it had attracted 9,000 subscribers generating about $500,000 in annual revenue.

Slate moved all content behind a metered paywall for international readers in June 2015, explaining "our U.S.-based sales team sells primarily to domestic advertisers, many of whom only want to reach a domestic audience. ...The end result is that, outside the United States, we are not covering our costs." At the same time, it was stated that there were no plans for a domestic paywall.

Reputation for counterintuitive arguments ("Slate pitches") 
Since 2006, Slate has been known for publishing contrarian pieces arguing against commonly held views about a subject, giving rise to the #slatepitches Twitter hashtag in 2009. The Columbia Journalism Review has defined Slate pitches as "an idea that sounds wrong or counterintuitive proposed as though it were the tightest logic ever," and in explaining its success wrote "Readers want to click on Slate Pitches because they want to know what a writer could possibly say that would support their logic".

In 2014, Slates then editor-in-chief Julia Turner acknowledged a reputation for counterintuitive arguments forms part of Slate's "distinctive" brand, but argued that the hashtag misrepresents the site's journalism. "We are not looking to argue that up is down and black is white for the sake of being contrarian against all logic or intellectual rigor. But journalism is more interesting when it surprises you either with the conclusions that it reaches or the ways that it reaches them."

In a 2019 article for the site, Slate contributor Daniel Engber reflected on the changes that had occurred on the site since he started writing for it 15 years previously.  He suggested that its original worldview, influenced by its founder Kinsley and described by Engber as "feisty, surprising, debate-club centrist-by-default" and "liberal contrarianism", had shifted towards "a more reliable, left-wing slant", whilst still giving space for heterodox opinions, albeit "tempered by other, graver duties". He argued that this was necessary within the context of a "Manichean age of flagrant cruelty and corruption", although he also acknowledged that it could be "a troubling limitation".

Podcasts

According to NiemanLab, Slate has been involved in podcasts "almost from the very beginning" of the medium. Its first podcast offering, released on July 15, 2005, featured selected stories from the site read by Andy Bowers, who had joined Slate after leaving NPR in 2003. By June 2012, Slate had expanded their lineup to 19 podcasts, with Political Gabfest and Culture Gabfest being the most popular. This count had shrunk to 14 by February 2015, with all receiving six million downloads per month. The podcasts are "a profitable part of [Slate'''s] business"; the magazine charges more for advertising in its podcasts than in any of its other content.

 Amicus – legal commentary
 Audio Book Club Culture Gabfest Daily Podcast – some of everything
 Decoder Ring – with Willa Paskin
 The Waves (formerly DoubleX) – women's issues
 Hang Up and Listen – sports
 Hit Parade – pop music history
 If Then - technology, Silicon Valley, and tech policy
 Lexicon Valley – language issues
 Manners for the Digital Age Mom and Dad Are Fighting – parenting
 Money – business and finance
 One Year
 Political Gabfest Spoiler Specials – film discussion
 Studio 360 – pop culture and the arts, in partnership with Public Radio International
 The Gist Thirst Aid Kit
 Slow Burn
 Video Podcast TrumpcastSlate podcasts have gotten longer over the years. The original Gabfest ran 15 minutes; by 2012, most ran about 45 minutes.

Staff
Jacob Weisberg was Slate's editor from 2002 until 2008. Weisberg's deputy editor David Plotz then became editor until July 2014, when he was replaced by Julia Turner.

Turner resigned as editor of Slate'' in October 2018.

Jared Hohlt became editor-in-chief on April 1, 2019. He stepped down in January 2022.

Hillary Frey was named new editor in chief in May 2022.

Key executives

 Hillary Frey (editor in chief) 
 Dan Check (chief executive officer) 
 Charlie Kammerer (chief revenue officer)
 Lowen Liu (deputy editor)
 Josh Levin (editorial director)
 Allison Benedikt (executive editor)
 Susan Matthews (news director)
 Laura Bennett (features director)
 Jeffrey Bloomer (features editor) 
 Forrest Wickman (culture editor)

Notable contributors and departments

 Anne Applebaum (Foreigners)
 John Dickerson (Politics)
 Simon Doonan (Fashion)
 Stefan Fatsis (Hang Up and Listen)
 Ashley Feinberg (Politics)
 Daniel Gross (The Juice)
 Fred Kaplan (War Stories)
 Juliet Lapidos (Books / Explainer / Brow Beat)
 Dahlia Lithwick (Jurisprudence)
 Michael Moran (Reckoning / Foreign Policy)
 Timothy Noah (The Customer)
 Meghan O'Rourke (The Highbrow / Grieving)
 Daniel M. Lavery (Dear Prudence, since 2015)
 Mike Pesca (The Gist)
 Robert Pinsky (poetry editor)
 Phil Plait (Bad Astronomy / Science)
 Ron Rosenbaum (Spectator)
 William Saletan (Human Nature)
 Jack Shafer (Press Box)
 Eliot Spitzer (The Best Policy)
 Mike Steinberger (Drink)
 Dana Stevens (Surfergirl through 2005/Movies)
 Seth Stevenson (Ad Report Card / Well-Traveled)
 James Surowiecki (The Book Club)
 Leon Neyfakh (Podcast)
 Tom Vanderbilt (Transport)
 Jacob Weisberg (The Big Idea)
 Tim Wu (Technology/Jurisprudence)
 Emily Yoffe (Dear Prudence - until 2015 -, Human Guinea-pig)
 Reihan Salam (Politics)
 Laura Miller (Books and Culture)
 Carl Wilson (Music)

Past contributors

 Emily Bazelon
 Pete Buttigieg
 Paul Boutin
 Ian Bremmer
 Phil Carter
 David Edelstein
 Franklin Foer
 Sasha Frere-Jones
 Atul Gawande
 Austan Goolsbee
 Robert Lane Greene
 Virginia Heffernan
 David Helvarg
 Christopher Hitchens
 Jodi Kantor
 Mickey Kaus
 Patrick Radden Keefe
 Paul Krugman
 Steven Landsburg
 Will Leitch
 Farhad Manjoo
 Louis Menand
 Helaine Olen 
 David Plotz
 Daniel Radosh
 Bruce Reed
 Jody Rosen
 Herbert Stein
 James Surowiecki
 Julia Turner
 Josh Voorhees
 Rob Walker
 David Weigel
 Robert Wright
 Matthew Yglesias
 Fareed Zakaria

Other recurring features

 Assessment
 Books
 Dear Prudence (advice column)
 Dispatches
 Drink
 Food
 Foreigners
 Gaming
 Science Denial
 Shopping
 The Good Word (language)
 The Movie Club
 The TV Club

Summary columns
 Slatest (news aggregator)

References

External links

 
 Slate 

Online magazines published in the United States
Magazines established in 1996
Political magazines published in the United States
Cultural magazines published in the United States
Magazines published in New York City
American political websites
Podcasting companies